A thunderegg (or thunder egg) is a nodule-like rock, similar to a filled geode, that is formed within rhyolitic volcanic ash layers.
Thundereggs are rough spheres, most about the size of a baseball—though they can range from a little more than a centimeter (one half inch)  to over a meter (three feet) across. They usually contain centres of chalcedony which may have been fractured followed by deposition of agate, jasper or opal, either uniquely or in combination.  Also frequently encountered are quartz and gypsum crystals, as well as various other mineral growths and inclusions.  Thundereggs usually look like ordinary rocks on the outside, but slicing them in half and polishing them may reveal intricate patterns and colours.  A characteristic feature of thundereggs is that (like other agates) the individual beds they come from can vary in appearance, though they can maintain a certain specific identity within them.

Thunderegg is not synonymous with either geode or agate.  A geode is a simple term for a rock with a hollow in it, often with crystal formation/growth.  A thunderegg on the other hand is a specific geological structure.  A thunderegg may be referred to as a geode if it has a hollow in it, but not all geodes are thundereggs because there are many different ways for a hollow to form.  Similarly, a thunderegg is just one of the forms that agate can assume.

Occurrence
Thundereggs are found globally where conditions are optimal.  In the US, Oregon is one of the most famous thunderegg locations.  Germany is also an important center for thunderegg agates (especially sites like St Egidien and Gehlberg). Other places known for thundereggs include Ethiopia, Poland, Romania, Turkey, Mexico, Argentina, Canada, Mount Hay and Tamborine Mountain (Australia), and the Esterel massif (France).

Formation
Thundereggs are found in flows of rhyolite lava. They form in the lava from the action of water percolating through the porous rock carrying silica in solution. The deposits lined and filled the cavity, first with a darker matrix material, then an inner core of agate or chalcedony. The various colors come from differences in the minerals found in the soil and rock that the water has moved through.

State rock designation
On March 30, 1965, the thunderegg was designated as the Oregon state rock by a joint resolution of the Oregon Legislative Assembly. While thundereggs can be collected all over Oregon, the largest deposits are found in Crook, Jefferson, Malheur, Wasco and Wheeler counties. The world's largest thunderegg, a 1.75 ton specimen, is housed by the Rice Northwest Museum of Rocks and Minerals in Hillsboro, Oregon.

Legend
Native American legend reportedly considers the rocks to be the eggs of the thunderbirds which occupied Mount Hood and Mount Jefferson. Thunder Spirits on the mountains hurled the "eggs" at each other.

Images

See also
Lithophysa

References

External links
 Geode Kid's Collection in Deming New Mexico on Mindat
 Geologic Snowflake Hunters Flock To Oregon For Thundereggs  Documentary produced by Oregon Field Guide

Gemstones
Minerals
Igneous rocks
Symbols of Oregon
Cascadian folklore